This is a timeline documenting events of Jazz in the year 2005.

Events

January 
 27 – The 8th Polarjazz Festival started in Longyearbyen, Svalbard (January 27 – 29).

February
 13 – The 47th Annual Grammy Awards
 Ray Charles & Norah Jones in the categories Record of the Year and Best Pop Collaboration with Vocals for the song "Here We Go Again"
 Ray Charles & Various Artists in the category Album of the Year and Best Pop Vocal Album for Genius Loves Company
 The Maria Schneider Orchestra in the category Best Large Jazz Ensemble Album for Concert in the Garden
 Bill Frisell in the category Best Contemporary Jazz Album for Unspeakable
 Herbie Hancock in the category Best Jazz Instrumental Solo for the album Speak Like a Child
 McCoy Tyner with Gary Bartz, Terence Blanchard, Christian McBride and Lewis Nash in the category Best Jazz Instrumental Album, Individual or Group for Illuminations
 Nancy Wilson in the category Best Jazz Vocal Album for R.S.V.P. (Rare Songs, Very Personal)
 Charlie Haden in the category Best Latin Jazz Album for Land of the Sun

March
 3 – The very first Jakarta International Java Jazz Festival started in Jakarta, Indonesia (January 3 – 5).
 18
 The 32nd Vossajazz started at Voss, Norway (March 18 – 20).
 Berit Opheim was awarded Vossajazzprisen 2005.
 19 – Jan Gunnar Hoff performs the commissioned work Free flow songs for Vossajazz 2005.

April

May
 13 – The 34th Moers Festival started in Moers, Germany (May 13 – 16).
 25 – The 33rd Nattjazz 2005 started in Bergen, Norway (May 25 – June 4).

June
 23 – The very first Punktfestivalen started in Kristiansand, Norway (June 23–25).
 28 – The 17th Jazz Fest Wien started in Vienna, Austria (June 28 – July 29).
 30 – The 26th Montreal International Jazz Festival started in Montreal, Quebec, Canada (June 30 - July 10).

July
 1
 The 27th Copenhagen Jazz Festival started in Copenhagen, Denmark (July 1 – 10).
 The 39th Montreux Jazz Festival started in Montreux, Switzerland (July 1 – 16).
 6 – The 41st Kongsberg Jazzfestival started in Kongsberg, Norway (July 6 – 8).
 8 – The 30th North Sea Jazz Festival started in The Hague, Netherlands (July 8 – 10).
 16 – The 40th Pori Jazz Festival started in Pori, Finland (July 16 – 24).
 18 – The 45th Moldejazz started in Molde, Norway with Arild Andersen as artist in residence (July 18 – 23).
 19 – The 22nd Stockholm Jazz Festival started in Stockholm, Sweden (July 19 – 23).
 20 – The 58th Nice Jazz Festival started in Nice, France (July 20 – 27).
 22 – The 40th San Sebastian Jazz Festival started in San Sebastian, Spain (July 22 – 27).

August
 10 – The 19th Sildajazz started in Haugesund, Norway (August 10 – 14).
 12
 The 51st Newport Jazz Festival started in Newport, Rhode Island (August 12 – 14).
 The 22nd Brecon Jazz Festival started in Brecon, Wales (August 12 – 14).
 15 – The 20th Oslo Jazzfestival started in Oslo, Norway (August 15 – 21).
 23 – The hurricane Katrina destroys the "Cradle of Jazz", New Orleans (August 23–31).

September
 16 – The 48th Monterey Jazz Festival started in Monterey, California (September 16 – 18).

October

November
 11 – The 14th London Jazz Festival started in London, England (November 11 – 20).

December

Album released

January

February

March

April

May

June

July

August

September

October

November

December

Deaths

 January
 4 — Humphrey Carpenter, English biographer, writer, and radio broadcaster (born 1946).

 February
 8 — Jimmy Smith, American jazz organist (born 1928).
 15 – Bill Potts, American pianist and arranger (born 1928).
 20 – Pam Bricker, American singer and professor of music (born 1954).

 March
 8 — Larry Bunker, American drummer (born 1928).

 April
 7 — José Melis, Cuban-American bandleader and television personality (born 1920).
 14
 Andrew Bisset, Australian author, music educator, and singer (born 1953).
 Benny Bailey, American bebop and hard-bop trumpeter (born 1925).
 19
 Niels-Henning Ørsted Pedersen, Danish jazz bassist (heart attack) (born 1946).
 Stan Levey, American drummer (born 1926).
 22 – Arnie Lawrence, American saxophonist (born 1938).
 23 – Jimmy Woode, American upright bassist (born 1926).
 28 – Percy Heath, American upright bassist (born 1923).
 29 – Dianne Brooks, American singer (born 1939).

 May
 12 – Monica Zetterlund, Swedish singer and actress (born 1937).
 13 – Victor Sproles, American bassist (born 1927).
 29 – Oscar Brown, American singer, songwriter, playwright, poet, civil rights activist, and actor (born 1926).

 June
 15 – Per Henrik Wallin, Swedish pianist and composer (born 1946).
 16 – Billy Bauer, American cool jazz guitarist (born 1915).
 18 
 Chris Griffin, American trumpeter (born 1915)
 Basil Kirchin, English drummer and composer (born 1927).
 29 – Mikkel Flagstad, Norwegian saxophonist (born 1930).

 July
 2 — Tom Talbert, American jazz pianist, composer, and band leader (born 1924).
 4 — John Stubblefield, American saxophonist, flautist, and oboist (born 1945).
 16 – Blue Barron, American orchestra leader (born 1913).
 23 – Ted Greene, American fingerstyle jazz guitarist, columnist, and session musician (born 1946).
 25 – Albert Mangelsdorff, German trombonists and composer (born 1928).
 27 – Dom Um Romão, Brazilian drummer and percussionist (born 1935).
 29 – Al McKibbon, American jazz double bassist (born 1919).
 30 – Lucky Thompson, American jazz tenor and soprano saxophonist (born 1924).

 August
 6 — Keter Betts, American upright bassist (born 1928).
 12
 Charlie Norman, Swedish pianist and entertainer (born 1920).
 Francy Boland, Belgian composer and pianist (born 1929).
 15 – Earl Zindars, American composer, Bill Evans (born 1927).
 23 – Glenn Corneille, Dutch pianist (born 1970).

 September
 11 – Al Casey, American guitarist, Fats Waller's band (born 1915).
 17 – Jack Lesberg, American upright bassist (born 1920).
 25 – Georges Arvanitas, French pianist and organist (born 1931).

 October
 3 — Alfredo Rodríguez, Cuban pianist (born 1936).
 14 – Oleg Lundstrem, Soviet and Russian composer and conductor, Oleg Lundstrem Orchestra (born 1916).
 16 – Elmer Dresslar Jr., American voice actor and singer (born 1925).
 20 – Shirley Horn, American singer and pianist (born 1934).

 November
 13 – Harry Gold, British saxophonist and bandleader (born 1907).
 15 – Roy Brooks, American drummer (born 1938).
 19 – Bob Enevoldsen, American tenor saxophonist and valve trombonist (born 1920).

 December
 5 — Harry Pepl (60), Austrian guitarist (born 1945).
 19 – Billy Amstell, British reedist (born 1911).
 25 – Derek Bailey, English guitarist (born 1930).
 26 – Bill DeArango, American guitarist (born 1921).

See also

 List of years in jazz
 2000s in jazz
 2005 in music
 2005 in Swiss music

References

External links 
 History Of Jazz Timeline: 2005 at All About Jazz

2000s in jazz
Jazz